Maffin may refer to:

 Bongo Maffin, a South African kwaito music group.
 Maffin Bay, known as Teluk Maffin in Indonesian, a small bay in the Pacific Ocean.